Knud Aage Nielsen (born 1937) is a retired male badminton player from Denmark.

Career
With a singles game that featured consistency and excellent mobility, Nielsen played at a high international level from the late 1950s through the mid-1960s. In 1964 he won men's singles at the All England Open Badminton Championships, then considered the unofficial World Badminton Championships, narrowly defeating fellow Dane Henning Borch in the final. He played Thomas Cup (men's international team competition) singles for Denmark in the '60–'61 and '63–'64
campaigns, scoring Denmark's only singles victory in its controversial '64 Challenge Round loss to Indonesia.

He is the younger brother of Poul-Erik Nielsen three times an All England doubles champion.

Nielsen appeared in the Danish TV series Make badminton great again from 2022 about the history of Danish badminton.

Achievements

International tournaments 
Men's singles

Men's doubles

Mixed doubles

References 

Danish male badminton players
Living people
1937 births